Sharana or Sharan is the capital of Paktika Province, Afghanistan. It is located at an altitude of 2,200 meters. Its population was estimated to be 2,200 in 2006.
The city of Sharana has a population of 15,651 (in 2015) and is located within the heartland of the Sulaimankhel tribe of Ghilji Pashtuns. It has 6 districts and a total land area of 5,893 hectares. The total number of dwellings in this city are 1,739.

On 14 August 2021, Sharana was seized by Taliban fighters, becoming the twentieth provincial capital to be captured by the Taliban as part of the wider 2021 Taliban offensive.

Climate
With an influence from the local steppe climate, Sharana features a cold semi-arid climate (BSk) under the Köppen climate classification. The average temperature in Sharana is 10.8 °C, while the annual precipitation averages 265 mm. September is the driest month with 1 mm of rainfall, while March, the wettest month, has an average precipitation of 54 mm.

July is the warmest month of the year with an average temperature of 23.6 °C. The coldest month January has an average temperature of -4.5 °C, with the average lows at -10.9 °C.

Land use
Barren land and agriculture account for 73% of total land. Sharana has the largest share of land classified as institutional (14%) of any Afghan provincial capital.

See also
 Sharana District
 Paktika Province
 Forward Operating Base Sharana

References

Populated places in Paktika Province
Provincial capitals in Afghanistan